Bryan Neese (born August 30, 1964) is an American professional strongman competitor. Bryan is best known for winning the 1999 America's Strongest Man contest, his career best win.

Bryan also spends time ministering the gospel to children, and supports the Paul Anderson Youth Home with the proceeds he receives from his appearances. Bryan currently works as a weightlifting Coach at Brownsburg High School in Brownsburg, Indiana.

Personal records
Squat: 
Bench Press: 
Deadlift: 
Military press:

References

| colspan="3" style="text-align:center;"| America's Strongest Man 
|- 
|  style="width:30%; text-align:center;"| Preceded by:Karl Gillingham
|  style="width:40%; text-align:center;"| First (1999)
|  style="width:30%; text-align:center;"| Succeeded by:Brian Schoonveld

American strength athletes
Living people
1964 births